Elections were held in Montana on November 2, 2010.  Primary elections took place on June 8, 2010.

Federal

United States House

Denny Rehberg, Montana's current at-large Congressman, ran for re-election.  He defeated Libertarian Mike Fellows and Democrat Dennis McDonald.

State
Many state offices in Montana, including Governor, Lieutenant Governor, Secretary of State, Attorney General, Auditor, and Superintendent of Public Instruction, were not up for re-election in 2010.

Supreme Court Justice
On the Montana Supreme Court, Supreme Court Justice No. 2 and Supreme Court Justice No. 4 were up for election.

District Court Judge
Six seats were available in: District 1, Department 4; District 4, Department 4; District 11, Department 4; District 13, Department 6; District 19, Department 1; and District 21, Department 1.

Public Service Commissioner
Two Public Service Commissioners, representing District 1 and District 5, were elected in 2010.

State Senator
Twenty-five seats in the Montana Senate were up for election in 2010.

State Representative
All one hundred seats of the Montana House of Representatives were up for election in 2010.

Judicial positions
Multiple judicial positions were up for election in 2010.
Montana judicial elections, 2010 at Judgepedia

Ballot measures
Three statewide initiatives were voted on and all passed.

References

External links
Elections Division of the Montana Secretary of State
Candidates for Montana State Offices at Project Vote Smart
Montana Polls at Pollster.com

Montana Congressional Races in 2010 campaign finance data from OpenSecrets
Montana 2010 campaign finance data from Follow the Money
 Imagine Election – Find out which candidates will appear on your ballot – search by address or zip code.

 
Montana